This is a partial list of extinct languages of South America, languages which have undergone language death, have no native speakers and no spoken descendant.

There are 176 languages listed.

Argentina
Abipón
Chané
Cacán 
Het
 All languages of the Charruan family, as Chaná and Güenoa
Henia-Camiare
Huarpe languages: Allentiac and Millcayac
Lule
Ona
Puelche
Tehuelche
Tonocoté

Bolivia
Canichana
Cayubaba
Chane
Itene
Saraveca
Sirinó

Brazil
Acroá
Arara
Arawá
Aroã
Guana
Kaimbé
Kamakan
Kamba
Kambiwá
Kanoé
Kapinawá
Kariri-Xocó
Maritsauá
Nukuini
Oti
Otuke
Pankararé
Paranawát
Pataxó-Hãhaãi
Potiguara
Puri
Tapeba
Tingui-Boto
Truká
Tukumanféd
Turiwara
Tuxá
Tuxinawa
Uamué
Umotina
Wakoná
Wasu
Wiraféd
Xakriabá
Yabaâna

Chile
Kakauhua
Chono
Selk'nam

Colombia
Aarufi
Andaqui
Anserma
Arma-Pozo
Atanque
Atunceta
Barbacoas
Calamari
Chibcha
Chitarero
Ciaman
Coanoa
Cospique
Duit
Envuelto
Guaca
Guanaca
Guane
Guenta
Hacaritama
Idabaez
Irra
Jamundi
Jitirijiti
Lache
Lili
Macaguaje
Masaya
Mompox
Morcote
Muzo
Nori
Otegua
Panche
Pantágora
Malibú
Moconá
Nutabe
Pacabuey
Papale
Pasto
Pijao
Pubenza
Quimbaya
Quindío
Sinú
Tama
Tamaní
Tegua
Timaná
Yalcón
Yamesí
Yariguí
Yauna
Yenmu
Yurumanguí
Yupuá
Zamirua

Ecuador
Bolona
Campaces
Canelo
Cañar
Caranqui
Colima
Esmeralda
Huacavilca
Malaba
Rabona
Malacato
Manta
Palta
Panzaleo
Puná
Puruhá
Quijo
Quillacinga
Xiroa
Yumbo

Guyana
Skepi Creole Dutch

Paraguay
Emok

Peru
Aguano
Andoa
Atsahuaca
Aushiri
Bagua
Catacao
Chacha
Chira
Chirino
Cholón
Colán
Copallén
Culle
Hibito
Maynas
Mochica 
Nocaman
Olmos
Omurano
Panobo
Puquina
Remo
Pantanagua
Patagón
Quingnam
Sácata
Sechura
Sensi
Tabancale
Tallán
Tequiraca
Yameo

Southern Cone
Kunza (Argentina & Chile)
Yaghan (Argentina & Chile)

Venezuela
Cumanagoto
Maipure
Máku
Paraujano
Tamanaku
Yavitero

See also
Extinct languages of the Marañón River basin
List of unclassified languages of South America
List of indigenous languages of South America

South America
Languages of South America
Extinct languages